Baniwa is a genus of moths in the  family Sphingidae, containing only one species, Baniwa yavitensis, which is known from Venezuela and Amazonas and Pará in Brazil.

There are probably multiple generations per year. Adults have been recorded in July in Brazil.

References

External links

Dilophonotini
Moths described in 1981
Moths of South America